Bret Taylor (born July 10, 1980) is an American computer programmer and entrepreneur. He is most notable for co-creating Google Maps and his tenures as the CTO of Facebook (now Meta Platforms), the chairman of Twitter, Inc.'s board of directors prior to its acquisition by Elon Musk, and as the co-CEO of Salesforce (alongside Marc Benioff). Taylor was additionally one of the founders of FriendFeed and the creator of Quip.

Education 
Taylor attended Stanford University, where he earned his bachelor's degree and master's degree in computer science in 2002 and 2003, respectively.

Career 
In 2003, Taylor was hired by Google as an associate product manager. In 2005, he co-created Google Maps. Taylor left Google in June 2007 to join venture capital firm Benchmark Capital as an entrepreneur-in-residence, where he and several other former Google employees founded the social network web site FriendFeed. Taylor was CEO of FriendFeed until August 2009, when the company was acquired by Facebook for an estimated $50 million. The acquisition led to Facebook adopting the "Like" button from FriendFeed. After the acquisition, Taylor joined Facebook and became CTO in 2010.

In 2012, Taylor left Facebook to found Quip, a competitor to Google Docs. Quip was acquired by Salesforce in 2016. That year, Twitter, Inc. announced that Taylor was appointed to their board of directors. In 2021, he became chairman of Twitter. He remained in the position until the entire board of directors were dissolved following the acquisition of Twitter by Elon Musk in October 2022.

In 2017, Taylor was named chief product officer at Salesforce. In 2019, Taylor was named president and chief operating officer at Salesforce. As COO, Taylor led Salesforce's acquisition of Slack, which closed in 2021. Taylor also led the creation of a system dubbed Customer 360 at Salesforce and started an associate product manager program at the company. In November 2021, Taylor was named vice chair and co-CEO at Salesforce. On November 30, 2022, it was announced that Taylor would be stepping down as co-CEO and vice chair at Salesforce at the end of January 2023.

References

External links

American computer businesspeople
Living people
Facebook employees
Stanford University alumni
Google employees
American computer programmers
American technology company founders
American technology chief executives
21st-century American businesspeople
Salesforce
1980 births